Yawhen Branavitski (born 15 May 1981) is a retired Belarusian professional footballer. His last club was Khimik Svetlogorsk.

Career
Born in Soligorsk, Branavitski began playing football in FC RUOR Minsk's youth system. He joined FC Shakhtyor Soligorsk's senior team and made his Belarusian Premier League debut in 2001.

References

External links

1981 births
Living people
Belarusian footballers
Belarusian expatriate footballers
FC Shakhtyor Soligorsk players
FC Vorskla Poltava players
FC Minsk players
FC BATE Borisov players
Ukrainian Premier League players
Expatriate footballers in Ukraine
Belarusian expatriate sportspeople in Ukraine
Expatriate footballers in Poland
FC Slavia Mozyr players
FC Torpedo-BelAZ Zhodino players
FC Gorodeya players
FC SKVICH Minsk players
FC Rechitsa-2014 players
FC Khimik Svetlogorsk players
FC RUOR Minsk players
Association football midfielders